Methyltrimethoxysilane is an organosilicon compound with the formula CH3Si(OCH3)3.  It is a colorless, free-flowing liquid.  It is a crosslinker in the preparation of polysiloxane polymers.

Preparation, structure and reactivity
Methyltrimethoxysilane is usually prepared from methyltrichlorosilane and methanol:

CH3SiCl3 + 3 CH3OH  →  CH3Si(OCH3)3 + 3 HCl
Alcoholysis of alkylchlorosilanes typically proceeds via an SN2 mechanism.  Inversion of the configuration is favored during nucleophilic attack when displacing good leaving groups, such as chloride.  In contrast, displacement of poor leaving groups, such as alkoxide, retention is favored.

Methyltrimethoxysilane is tetrahedral and is often described as sp3 hybridized. It has idealized C3v point symmetry.

Hydrolysis of MTM proceeds both under acidic and basic conditions. Under acid conditions, rates of successive hydrolyses for methyltrimethoxysilane decreases with each step. Under basic condition the opposite is true.

See also
 Octadecyltrimethoxysilane

References

Silyl ethers
Alkoxides